Rayford Cooks (born August 25, 1962) is a former American football defensive end. He played for the Houston Oilers in 1987.

References

1962 births
Living people
American football defensive ends
North Texas Mean Green football players
Houston Gamblers players
Montreal Alouettes players
Houston Oilers players
BC Lions players
National Football League replacement players